William Denis Broderick (19 May 1908 – 4 April 1946) was an Irish swimmer. He competed in the men's 400 metre freestyle event at the 1928 Summer Olympics.

References

External links
 

1908 births
1946 deaths
Irish male freestyle swimmers
Olympic swimmers of Ireland
Swimmers at the 1928 Summer Olympics
Place of birth missing
20th-century Irish people